Armenia competed at the 2011 World Aquatics Championships in Shanghai, China between July 16 and 31, 2011.

Swimming

Armenia qualified 3 swimmers.

Men

Women

Synchronised Swimming

Armenia qualified 1 athlete in Synchronised Swimming.

Women

References

Nations at the 2011 World Aquatics Championships
2011 in Armenian sport
Armenia at the World Aquatics Championships